The controller parameters are typically matched to the process characteristics and since the process may change, it is important that the controller parameters are chosen in such a way that the closed loop system is not sensitive to variations in process dynamics. One way to characterize sensitivity is through the nominal sensitivity peak :

where  and  denote the plant and controller's transfer function in a basic closed loop control system written in the Laplace domain using unity negative feedback. 

The sensitivity function , which appears in the above formula also describes the transfer function from external disturbance to process output. In fact, assuming an additive disturbance n after the output 

of the plant, the transfer functions of the closed loop system are given by

Hence, lower values of  suggest further attenuation of the external disturbance. The sensitivity function tells us how the disturbances are influenced by feedback. Disturbances with frequencies such that  is less than one are reduced by an amount equal to the distance to the critical point  and disturbances with frequencies such that  is larger than one are amplified by the feedback.

It is important that the largest value of the sensitivity function be limited for a control system and it is common to require that the maximum value of the sensitivity function, be in a range of 1.3 to 2.

Sensitivity circle
The quantity  is the inverse of the shortest distance from the Nyquist curve of the loop transfer function to the critical point .

References

See also
 Robust control
 PID controller
 Bode's sensitivity integral

Control theory